Ditton Priors railway station was a station in Ditton Priors, Shropshire, England. The station was opened in 1908 and closed in 1938.

References

Further reading

Disused railway stations in Shropshire
Railway stations in Great Britain opened in 1908
Railway stations in Great Britain closed in 1938
Former Great Western Railway stations